Jasna Matić (born 14 January 1964) is a Serbian business consultant and a politician. She served as the Minister of Telecommunications and Information Society from 2008 to 2011.

Education and career
She was born in Belgrade and received a degree in Civil Engineering in 1994 from the University of Belgrade's Faculty of Civil Engineering as well as a degree in Business Administration in 2001 from Washington University in St. Louis.

From 1994 to 1999, she worked as a civil engineer and project coordinator in Masinoproject Kopring, Belgrade.

From 2001 to 2002, she was Adviser to the Yugoslav Deputy Prime Minister. She was also a World Bank consultant in Washington D.C. from 2000 to 2001. She was Chief Adviser of the project for the promotion of Serbia's competitiveness to Booz Allen Hamilton, USAID.

From 2004 to 2007, she was Director of the Serbian Investment and Export Promotion Agency - SIEPA.

She was appointed State Secretary of the Ministry of Economy and Regional Development in 2007 and held the position until July 2008.

On 7 July 2008, she was elected Minister of Telecommunications and Information Society and was dismissed on 14 March 2011.

She held the position of the State Secretary for Digital Agenda in the Ministry of Culture, Information, and Informational Society. In October 2012, she was appointed as an advisor at the Ministry of Finance, a position she held until the reconstruction of the Government of Serbia in September 2013.

Personal life
She speaks English, and has a working knowledge of Italian and German.

References

External links 
 

1964 births
Living people
Singers from Belgrade
Olin Business School (Washington University) alumni
University of Belgrade Faculty of Civil Engineering alumni
Government ministers of Serbia
Women government ministers of Serbia
Politicians from Belgrade